An impersonator is someone who imitates or copies the behavior or actions of another.  There are many reasons for impersonating someone:

Entertainment: An entertainer impersonates a celebrity, generally for entertainment, and makes fun of their personal lives, recent scandals and known behavior patterns. Especially popular objects of impersonation are Elvis Presley (see Elvis impersonator), Michael Jackson (see Michael Jackson impersonator) and Madonna (see Madonna impersonator). Entertainers who impersonate multiple celebrities as part of their act, can be sorted into impressionists and celebrity impersonators. Male drag queens have traditionally been called "female impersonators", although this terminology is now considered outdated. Minstrel shows were a popular form of theater in the United States in which white people impersonated black people by wearing blackface makeup and imitating Southern black speech and music.
Crime: As part of a criminal act such as identity theft. This is usually where the criminal is trying to assume the identity of another, in order to commit fraud, such as accessing confidential information, or to gain property not belonging to them. Also known as social engineering and impostors.
Decoys, used as a form of protection for political and military figures. This involves an impersonator who is employed (or forced) to perform during public appearances, to mislead observers.
Sowing discord, causing people to fight, or dislike each other for social, business or political gain.

Celebrity impersonators

Celebrity impersonators are impostors who look similar to celebrities and dress in such a way as to imitate them. Impersonators are known as sound-alikes, look-alikes, impressionists, imitators tribute artists and wannabees. The interest may have originated with the need or desire to see a celebrity who has died. One of the most prominent examples of this phenomenon is the case of Elvis Presley.
Edward Moss has appeared in movies and sitcoms, impersonating Michael Jackson.

Tom Jones has attracted his share of impersonators from different places around the world. From the United States, to South East Asia, to the UK, there are performers who either sound like him or imitate his act.

Notable impersonators

Maurice LaMarche
 Frank Welker
 Jim Cummings
Rob Paulsen
Tress MacNeille
Dan Castellaneta
Moin Akhter
Joe Alaskey has impersonated Jackie Gleason and Mel Blanc
Shafaat Ali
Anthony Atamanuik impersonates Donald Trump
Ate Glow did comedic impersonations of Philippine President Gloria Macapagal Arroyo
Alec Baldwin impersonates Donald Trump
Rory Bremner
Steve Bridges
Reggie Brown impersonates Barack Obama
Frank Caliendo
Jim Carrey
Dana Carvey
Dmitry Orlov, occasionally does impersonations of Berl Lazar
Marc Dreier
Jimmy Fallon (does regular impersonations, but better known for impersonating famous singers)
Will Ferrell
Tina Fey
David Frye
Mikheil Gelovani portrayed Joseph Stalin at least a dozen times in film in their lifetimes
Frank Gorshin—several actors, best known for Kirk Douglas and Burt Lancaster
Sunil Grover
Charlie Chaplin—parodied Adolf Hitler in the film The Great Dictator
Bill Hader
Darrell Hammond
Hal Holbrook has portrayed Mark Twain
Jay Jason
Clay Jenkinson portrays Thomas Jefferson, Meriwether Lewis, Theodore Roosevelt and Robert Oppenheimer and others
Val Kilmer has portrayed Mark Twain
Jan Leighton, famous for his impersonations of historical figures, estimated at over 3,000 in his lifetime
Rich Little, called "The Man of a Thousand Voices"
Ross Marquand
Kate McKinnon
Vaughn Meader
Jim Meskimen
El Moreno Michael
Sammy Petrillo, best known for his Jerry Lewis impersonation
Jay Pharoah
Jim Post portrays Mark Twain
Mike Randall has portrayed Mark Twain and Charles Dickens
Stevie Riks
Tim Russell
Sour Shoes
Martin Short
Kevin Spacey
Aries Spears
Freddie Starr
Larry Storch
Jeffrey Weissman has portrayed Mark Twain and Crispin Glover, the latter of whom sued over Weissman's impersonation of him
Joe Wiegand portrays 26th US president, Theodore Roosevelt
Kristen Wiig
Emlyn Williams impersonated Charles Dickens
Robin Williams
Debra Wilson
Howard X, best known for his impersonation of Kim Jong-un
Gravity Noir impersonated Culture Club with lead singer Patrick Knight impersonating Boy George
Fátima Flórez portrays Cristina Kirchner
Jess Harnell

Criminal impersonation
In England and Wales, the Poor Law Amendment Act 1851, section 3, made it an offence to impersonate a "person entitled to vote" at an election. In the case of Whiteley v Chappell (1868), the literal rule of statutory interpretation was employed to find that a dead person was not a "person entitled to vote" and consequently a person accused of this offence was acquitted.

Although in a Colorado case, an immigrant was charged with "criminal impersonation" for using another person's Social Security number when signing up for a job, some courts have ruled that supplying this wrong information may not be criminal. The ruling hinges on whether there was harm to the other person.

See also 
 Impressionist
 Look-alike
 Personation
 Police impersonation
 Shi (personator), in the Chinese ancestor ritual: a figure impersonating ancestors
 Soundboard, victim soundboard
 Tribute act
 Wannabe
 Identity fraud
 Identity theft

References

Acting
Deception
 
Crimes
Comedy genres